The 2008 Solihull Metropolitan Borough Council election took place on 1 May 2008 to elect members of Solihull Metropolitan Borough Council in the West Midlands, England. One third of the council was up for election and the Conservative Party gained overall control of the council from no overall control.

Campaign
17 seats were contested in the election, with the Conservatives, Liberal Democrats, Labour and Green parties contesting every ward. The British National Party had 12 candidates, up from 5 in the 2007 election, the United Kingdom Independence Party stood 9 candidates and the sole Independent stood in St Alphege, having previously won a seat there in a 2005 by-election for the Conservatives. Among those standing were Jim Ryan, defending Bickenhill as a Conservative, having previously won it as an Independent after over twenty years of being a Labour councillor there, Howard Allen returned to the Liberal Democrats to defend his seat in Shirley West, after time as an Independent and Peter Hogarth in Silhill where he had lost his seat in 2007. Meanwhile, 2 councillors stood down at the election, Conservative Susan Gomm and Liberal Democrat June Gandy from Silhill and Shirley East wards respectively.

The Conservatives had lost their majority on the council at the 2007 election but continued to run it as a minority administration. During the campaign the Conservative party leader David Cameron visited Solihull, saying that the council was well run under the Conservatives and that they were hopeful of making gains. The Liberal Democrats criticised the record of the council on recycling, said they would create more activities for young people to take part in and called for the Liberal Democrats to be represented in the council's cabinet. Meanwhile, Labour said its councillors had a strong impact on the council and had been involved in getting the regeneration project for northern Solihull started.

Election result
The results saw the Conservatives regain a majority on the council after making 2 gains. The Conservatives gained Kingshurst and Fordbridge from Labour and Blythe from the Liberal Democrats, while Jim Ryan was re-elected as a Conservative in Bickenhill. This meant the Conservatives took a 1-seat majority with 26 of the 51 councillors, although they did lose 1 seat to the Liberal Democrats in Elmdon.

Meanwhile, the Green party won a first seat on the council after winning Smith's Wood ward by 331 votes. The Green's Mike Sheridan defeated the Labour leader on the council, Hugh Hendry, who had been a councillor for 18 years. Sheridan thus became the first Green councillor in the West Midlands conurbation and one of only 4 in the whole Midlands, after a campaign that he said focused on regeneration and preserving green space.

This result had the following consequences for the total number of seats on the council after the elections :

Ward results

References

2008
Solihull
2000s in the West Midlands (county)